is a passenger railway station located in the city of Tachikawa, Tokyo, Japan, operated by the private railway operator Seibu Railway.

Lines
The station is served by the Seibu Haijima Line, and is located 9.6 kilometers from the starting point of that line at Kodaira Station.

Station layout
The station consists of two elevated side platforms serving two tracks, with the station building located underneath.

History
Musashi-Sunagawa Station opened on 12 December 1983.

Station numbering was introduced on all Seibu Railway lines during fiscal 2012, with Musashi-Sunagawa Station becoming "SS34".

Passenger statistics
In fiscal 2019, the station was the 65th busiest on the Seibu network with an average of 12,255 passengers daily. 

The passenger figures for previous years are as shown below.

Surrounding area
Tamagawa Aqueduct

See also
List of railway stations in Japan

References

External links

 Musashi-Sunagawa Station information 

Railway stations in Tokyo
Stations of Seibu Railway
Railway stations in Japan opened in 1983
Seibu Haijima Line
Tachikawa, Tokyo